The 1992 season was the first season in the top Ukrainian football league for Tavriya Simferopol. Tavriya competed in Vyshcha Liha, and Ukrainian Cup.

Players

Squad information

Transfers

In

Out

Pre-season and friendlies

Competitions

Overall

Premier League

League table

Results summary

Results by round

Matches

Notes:

Ukrainian Cup

Soviet Cup

At least three Ukrainian clubs qualified for the rounds that were conducted following the official dissolution of the Soviet Union. All of them withdrew the competition.

Statistics

Appearances and goals

|-
! colspan=12 style=background:#dcdcdc; text-align:center| Goalkeepers

|-
! colspan=12 style=background:#dcdcdc; text-align:center| Defenders

|-
! colspan=12 style=background:#dcdcdc; text-align:center| Midfielders 

|-
! colspan=12 style=background:#dcdcdc; text-align:center| Forwards

Last updated:

References

External links
 "Таврія" Сімферополь -1992. ukr-footbal.org.ua

Tavriya Simferopol
SC Tavriya Simferopol seasons
Ukrainian football championship-winning seasons